The Schladminger 4-Berge-Schaukel is the name of four interconnected ski mountains in Austria. It has a total of 167 kilometres of pistes and 81 lift facilities between the four mountains: Hauser Kaibling, Planai, Hochwurzen, and Reiteralm.

Ski areas in Austria
Tourist attractions in Styria
Geography of Styria